Robbe is a surname. Notable people with the surname include:

Albert Robbe (1916–?), Belgian boxer
Jan Robbe (born 1980), Belgian musician
Mario Robbe (born 1973), Dutch darts player
Michel Robbe (born 1946),  French film and theater actor and television host
Scott Robbe, American film and television producer
Robbe-Grille
Alain Robbe-Grillet (1922–2008), French writer and filmmaker, husband of Catharine
Catherine Robbe-Grillet (born 1930),  French theatre and cinema actress, wife of Alain

Dutch-language surnames
Surnames from given names